Jerome Alan Heidenreich (February 4, 1950 – April 18, 2002) was an American competition swimmer, Olympic champion, and former world record-holder.  He competed at the 1972 Summer Olympics in Munich, Germany, where he received gold medals in the 4×100-meter medley relay, and 4×100-meter freestyle relay.  He received a silver medal in 100-meter freestyle, and a bronze medal in 100-meter butterfly.

He set six world records during his swimming career, all as a relay team member.

Heidenreich was inducted into the International Swimming Hall of Fame as an "Honor Swimmer" in 1992.

He became a swimming coach in the 1980s. He was married three times. In July 2001, Heidenreich had a mild stroke which left him with a degree of paralysis on his left side. On April 18, 2002 he killed himself with an overdose of prescription medicine at his home in Paris, Texas.

See also
 List of members of the International Swimming Hall of Fame
 List of Olympic medalists in swimming (men)
 List of Southern Methodist University people
 World record progression 4 × 100 metres freestyle relay
 World record progression 4 × 100 metres medley relay
 World record progression 4 × 200 metres freestyle relay

References

External links

 

1950 births
2002 suicides
Drug-related suicides in Texas
American male butterfly swimmers
American male freestyle swimmers
World record setters in swimming
Olympic bronze medalists for the United States in swimming
Olympic gold medalists for the United States in swimming
Olympic silver medalists for the United States in swimming
Sportspeople from Tulsa, Oklahoma
SMU Mustangs men's swimmers
Swimmers at the 1971 Pan American Games
Swimmers at the 1972 Summer Olympics
Medalists at the 1972 Summer Olympics
Pan American Games gold medalists for the United States
Pan American Games silver medalists for the United States
Pan American Games medalists in swimming
Universiade medalists in swimming
Universiade silver medalists for the United States
Medalists at the 1970 Summer Universiade
Medalists at the 1971 Pan American Games